Yersinia is a network security/hacking tool for Unix-like operating systems, designed to take advantage of some weakness in different network protocols. Yersinia is considered a valuable and widely used security tool. As of 2017 Yersinia is still under development with a latest stable version number 0.8.2 available only at GitHub source code repository.

Attacks for the following network protocols are implemented:

 Spanning Tree Protocol (STP) 
 Cisco Discovery Protocol (CDP) 
 Dynamic Trunking Protocol (DTP) 
 Dynamic Host Configuration Protocol (DHCP) 
 Hot Standby Router Protocol (HSRP) 
 IEEE 802.1Q 
 IEEE 802.1X 
 Cisco Inter-Switch Link (ISL) 
 VLAN Trunking Protocol (VTP)

Yersinia was rated #59 at SecTools.Org: Top 125 Network Security Tools

Similar Tools 

 Mausezahn a traffic generator for OSI layer two and above
 Scapy an interactive Python based packet crafting tool

External links 
 
 GitHub source code repository

Computer security software